The Roulettes were a British rock and roll and beat group formed in London in 1961. They were recruited to play as the backing group to singer Adam Faith the following year, and continued to perform and record until the late 1960s.

History
The group originated among friends at Sutton High School for Boys, including guitarist Peter Thorp.  Originally called the Strangers, they were seen by publicist Leslie Perrin, who recommended them to Adam Faith's manager Eve Taylor.  Faith was looking for a touring band that would enable him to perform similar music to that of the beat bands then emerging from Merseyside.  Renamed as the Roulettes, the band - then comprising Peter Thorp, Martin Blackwell, Tony Burgess and John Roberts - first performed with Faith at the Royal Albert Hall in September 1961.

The group toured widely with Faith between 1961 and 1963, with several changes of personnel, and recorded one unsuccessful single for Pye, "Hully Gully Slip'n'Slide".  By early 1963, the group comprised Thorp (guitar), John Rogers (bass), Bob Henrit (drums), and Russ Ballard (guitar and keyboards).  They recorded a lengthy series of short 15-minute shows with Adam Faith for Radio Luxembourg.  John Rogers was killed in a car crash in May 1963; he was replaced by John 'Mod' Rogan, previously of Hartlepool group the Hartbeats.   They began recording with Adam Faith - who had previously recorded with session musicians - for the Parlophone label, and their records were credited to "Adam Faith with The Roulettes".  They enjoyed a run of chart hits in the mid-1960s, including the UK chart hits; "The First Time", "We Are in Love", "I Love Being in Love With You", "If He Tells You", and "Someone's Taken Maria Away".

They also recorded in their own right for Parlophone, recording several early compositions by Chris Andrews, though none of their singles reached the chart.  Their only album Stakes And Chips was released in 1965 with similar lack of success  As well as backing Adam Faith on record, they accompanied him on tour until October 1965, most notably backing him on a 'Live' album. Early in 1967 they joined the Philips Fontana label but still the charts eluded them, although they toured Europe until later that year when the group split up.

Band members Russ Ballard and Bob Henrit went on to join Unit 4 + 2 formed by original Roulettes' member Brian Parker (on whose 1965 number one song, "Concrete and Clay", they had both previously played); the two would later also become members of rock band Argent.  In addition Ballard had later success as a solo artist and songwriter, whilst Henrit became a renowned session drummer and also replaced The Kinks' long serving drummer Mick Avory in their later years.

Adam Faith's song "Cowman, Milk Your Cow", on which the Roulettes (Ballard, Rogan and Henrit) played, was written by Bee Gees members Barry and Robin Gibb. Fleetwood Mac's Peter Green also played guitar on the song.

Members
Peter Thorp – lead guitar, rhythm guitar (born 25 May 1944, Wimbledon, South West London), died 2 January 2021 from COVID (replaced Parker in the band)
Brian Parker – lead guitar (born Brian William Parker, 1940, Cheshunt, Hertfordshire, died 17 February 2001) (though left within short space of time)
Johnny Rogers – bass guitar (born John Rogers, 1941, Hertfordshire, died 27 May 1963, Lincolnshire from injuries sustained in a car crash)  
Alan 'Honk' Jones – saxophone (Alan Evan Thomas Jones, born 19 August 1933, Norwood, London, died 03 October 2022 Kent, (Left The Roulettes by his own choice)
Norman Stracey – rhythm guitar, also keyboards (born Norman Henry Stracey, 1941, Ware, Hertfordshire) (replaced Jones in the band when a saxophone player was no longer required) Alan Jones actually left the Roulettes by choice. He was not “no longer required”
Bob Henrit – drums (born Robert John Henrit, 2 May 1944, Broxbourne, Hertfordshire)
Russ Ballard – March 1963 onwards, keyboards, later lead guitar and lead vocals (born Russell Glyn Ballard, 31 October 1945, Waltham Cross, Hertfordshire) (replaced Stracey in the band, was recruited to play keyboards but was soon sharing lead guitar with Thorp) 
John 'Mod' Rogan – bass guitar, May 1963 onwards (born John George Rogan, 3 February 1944, Hartlepool, County Durham) (replaced Rogers following his unfortunate demise)

References

External links
[ The Roulettes biography] at Allmusic website

English rock music groups
Beat groups
Musical groups established in 1962
Musical groups disestablished in 1967
Musical groups from London
British rock and roll music groups
1962 establishments in England